Haoloto, is the sixth studio album, released in 2009, by the Oceanic group, Te Vaka. It won the Best Pacific Album category in the New Zealand Music Awards.

The title track is featured in "Gone Fishing", a short from the 2016 Walt Disney Pictures film Moana.

Track listing

All tracks written by Opetatia Foa'i unless otherwise noted.

References

External links
Te Vaka discography

2009 albums
Te Vaka albums